On September 4, 2022, a mass stabbing occurred in 13 locations on the James Smith Cree Nation and in Weldon, Saskatchewan, Canada, in which 12 people died and 18 others were injured. Some of the victims are believed to have been targeted, while others were randomly attacked. It is one of the deadliest massacres in Canadian history.

Emergency alerts relating to the incidents were issued throughout the province of Saskatchewan and later extended to Manitoba and Alberta. Police quickly identified and sought two suspects in the killing spree: brothers Damien Sanderson, 31, and Myles Sanderson, 30. On September 5, Damien was found dead with multiple wounds. At around 3:30 p.m. on September 7, after his vehicle was PIT-manoeuvred off the road by police, Myles surrendered and was arrested in Rosthern, Saskatchewan, before dying in police custody later that day. On October 6, the RCMP said there was evidence that Myles was solely responsible for all eleven homicides, including Damien's.

Events

Stabbings and manhunt 

At 5:40a.m. At 7:12a.m., the RCMP issued an emergency alert within the immediate region, advising residents to stay in secure locations and to use caution when allowing others into their homes. It also alerted citizens not to approach the suspects and instead report them to 9-1-1. 

At 8:20a.m., the civil emergency was expanded to the entirety of Saskatchewan, after the suspects were found to have access to a vehicle. At the request of the Saskatchewan RCMP, the civil emergency was later expanded to the entirety of the neighbouring provinces Alberta and Manitoba. Police checkpoints were established between Regina and Prince Albert. The suspects' vehicle was later spotted in Regina at 11:45a.m. 

According to Saskatchewan RCMP's commanding officer Rhonda Blackmore, a motive for the stabbings is unclear. Some of the victims may have been targeted, while others appear to have been attacked randomly. Dead and injured victims were found at 13 locations. STARS air ambulances and road ambulances were dispatched to triage and transport the wounded to hospitals. The Saskatchewan Health Authority initiated a code orange, briefly issuing additional staff in hospitals local to the stabbings to help with the influx of patients.

Discovery of suspects 
At 11:30a.m. on September 5, Damien was found dead at an existing James Smith Cree Nation crime scene. Authorities believed his injuries were not self-inflicted and that Myles may have also been injured.

On the afternoon on September 7, a break-and-enter was reported in the town of Wakaw, and Myles was reportedly spotted northeast of the town, armed with a knife. An emergency alert was issued by the RCMP,  warning that a man armed with a knife was last seen in Wakaw, had stolen a white Chevrolet Avalanche, and that the suspect was believed to be related to the stabbings. The stolen truck was spotted by the driver of an unmarked police vehicle driving westbound on Highway 11 towards Rosthern, and a PIT manoeuvre was used to direct it into a ditch. The driver of the truck was identified as Myles, and he was apprehended by police at around 3:30p.m. He surrendered and was arrested in Rosthern, Saskatchewan, before entering unspecified medical distress and dying in police custody later that day.

Casualties 
Twelve people died, including Myles and Damien Sanderson. All were adults, aged between 23 and 78 years. A further 18 people were injured. As of September 7, ten were hospitalized, two in critical condition. Several of those killed were Myles' in-laws, two of whom he admitted stabbing in 2015.

Perpetrator 
The RCMP initially identified two suspects who were wanted in connection with the stabbings; they were brothers Damien Sanderson, 31, and Myles-Brandon Sanderson, 30. They were believed to be driving a black Nissan Rogue, and were reportedly seen in Melfort and the Arcola Avenue area of Regina. Myles was charged with first-degree murder, attempted murder, and breaking and entering in connection with the attacks, and Damien with first-degree murder.  

At 11:30a.m. on September 5, Damien was found dead with visible injuries, unlikely to be self-inflicted, at an existing James Smith Cree Nation crime scene. 

Police had been searching for Myles Sanderson since May, when he stopped meeting with his caseworker. He had been given statutory release after serving a five-year sentence for assault, robbery, mischief, and making threats. According to the Parole Board of Canada, Myles had 59 previous convictions, which included assaulting a police officer. Due to these, he had a lifetime ban from weapons, and was ordered to stay away from alcohol and other drugs. He used cocaine since he was 14, and had a history of rage, mainly under the influence of alcohol and/or other drugs.

At around 3:30p.m. on September 7, Myles was apprehended by police. During an RCMP press conference later that evening, Blackmore said that Myles had died while in police custody. She said "he went into medical distress" while being transported in a police car, and was given CPR by officers. He was taken by ambulance to Royal University Hospital in Saskatoon, where he was pronounced dead.  An unnamed source told the Associated Press that Myles' death was from self-inflicted injuries, but the RCMP would not comment on this point, pending an autopsy. On September 9, the suspects' original vehicle was found abandoned east of Crystal Springs.

On October 6, the RCMP said Myles alone committed the killings, including that of Damien. They also said that Damien was involved in "the initial planning and preparation" for the stabbings but that "something may have changed" when the rampage commenced.

Reactions 
At noon on September 4, the Joint Chiefs and Councils of the James Smith Cree Nation declared a local state of emergency, effective until 5:00p.m. on September 30. Additionally, the community set up two emergency operations centres. The attacks occurred hours before the scheduled CFL football game between the Saskatchewan Roughriders and the Winnipeg Blue Bombers in Regina, part of the popular Labour Day Classic. Extra police were deployed to Mosaic Stadium in Regina during the game.

Queen Elizabeth II, in what would be her final public statement before her death the following day, said that she "mourn[s] with all Canadians at this tragic time". The premier of Saskatchewan, Scott Moe, said, "There are no words to adequately describe the pain and loss caused by this senseless violence." Prime Minister Justin Trudeau called the stabbings "horrific and heartbreaking", and said he was "thinking of those who have lost a loved one and of those who were injured".

The Peace Tower in Ottawa and all federal buildings in Saskatchewan flew the Canadian flag at half-mast. Premier Moe announced that all flags at provincial government buildings would be lowered to half-mast for ten days in honour of the dead. Universities, school boards, municipal governments, and other organizations have also lowered flags to half-mast and released statements of condolences, with the Regina, Saskatoon and Prince Albert First Nations University campuses hosting prayer and candlelight vigils.

It was suggested by analysts that the RCMP's extensive use of emergency alerts as part of public communications regarding the manhunt was a contrast and response to the 2020 Nova Scotia attacks, where the RCMP had relied almost exclusively on social media to post information regarding the suspect, and were unable to agree on an alert before the suspect was ultimately located and shot by police. At least 12 emergency alerts were issued between September 4 and 7: this included alerts directly related to the Sanderson manhunt, as well as alerts for unrelated reports of shots fired in Brittania, and Witchekan Lake First Nation.

The Parole Board of Canada committed to review the decision to release Myles Sanderson. Despite his extensive history of violence, Sanderson's initial grant of statutory release was mandatory. However, he violated his parole, leading to a suspension of his release, but the suspension was lifted despite the parole board acknowledging his high risk to re-offend violently.

During a September 8 press conference held at the Bernard Constant Community School in James Smith Cree Nation, Chief of James Smith Cree Nation, Darryl Burns, Grand Chief Brian Hardlotte, Chief Bart Tsannie, and Vice Chief Christopher Jobb called on Canada to "address the roots of violence in Indigenous communities". They called for federal parole board reforms, greater "autonomy for communities like theirs, including tribal police and the ability for bands to issue resolutions that could ban members from a community", as well as increased support for mental health and addictions treatment programs. Chief Burnswhose sister Gloria, a member of the community's response team and an addictions counsellor, was killed after responding alone to the emergency callsaid that the widow of Damien Sanderson should not bear the "guilt and shame and responsibility" for the stabbings and that his family were choosing to forgive. Chief Burns said that the plight of remote First Nation communities like theirs would only receive media attention for a two week interval after the tragedy, so it was important to articulate their concerns during that window of time.

See also

 2019 Northern British Columbia murders, a shooting spree that occurred in Canada three years prior to the stabbing spree

References

Stabbings
2022 crimes in Canada
2020s murders in Canada
Massacres in 2022
Stabbing attacks in 2022
September 2022 events in Canada
September 2022 crimes in North America
Deaths by stabbing in Canada
First Nations history in Saskatchewan
Mass stabbings in Canada
Massacres of First Nations
2022 stabbings
Stabbing attacks in Canada